The 1981 Plaid Cymru presidential election was held following the resignation of Gwynfor Evans, who had led the party since 1945. The election followed both the defeat at the 1979 general election of Evans in Carmarthen and the defeat earlier that year of the Yes side in 1979 devolution referendum.

The contest was between Caernarfon MP Dafydd Wigley and Meirionnydd Nant Conwy MP Dafydd Elis Thomas, both of whom had entered the House of Commons in February 1974.

The contest was won by Dafydd Wigley, who went on to serve until 1984.

Notes

References

Plaid Cymru leadership elections
1981 elections in the United Kingdom
1981 in Wales
1980s elections in Wales
Plaid Cymru presidential election